This is a list of film archives and cinematheques. Film archives collect, restore, investigate and conserve audiovisual content like films, documentaries, television programs and newsreel footage. Often, every country has its own film archive to preserve the national audiovisual heritage. The International Federation of Film Archives comprises more than 150 institutions in over 77 countries and the Association of European Film Archives and Cinematheques is an affiliation of 49 European national and regional film archives founded in 1991.

International
The European Film Gateway is a single access point to European film archives and cinematheques.

Albania
Albanian Central Film Archive

Angola
Cinemateca Nacional de Angola

Argentina
Museo del Cine Pablo Ducros Hicken

Armenia
Armenian National Cinematheque

Austria
 Austrian Film Museum

Australia 
National Film and Sound Archive

Bangladesh 
 Bangladesh Film Archive

Belgium
Cinémathèque royale de Belgique

Brazil
Arquivo Nacional
Cinemateca Brasileira

Bulgaria
Bulgarian National Film Archive

Burkina Faso
African Film Library/ FESPACO

Canada
 Cinémathèque québécoise
 Provincial Archives of Alberta
 Bell Lightbox - Film Reference Library
 West Coast Film Archive, Pacific Cinémathèque
 Library and Archives Canada

China 

 China Film Archive

Croatia
 Hrvatska kinoteka
 INDOK

Czech Republic
Národní filmový archiv

Estonia
Estonian Film Archives

France
 National Center of Cinematography and the moving image - CNC Archives Français du Film
 Institut national de l'audiovisuel
 Cinémathèque Française
 Cinémathèque de Bretagne

Finland
National Audiovisual Institute

Germany
Bundesarchiv Filmarchiv
Deutsches Filminstitut
Deutsche Kinemathek - Museum für Film und Fernsehen
Friedrich-Wilhelm-Murnau-Stiftung
Zentrum für Kunst und Medientechnologie, Karlsruhe

Hungary
Hungarian National Film Archive
Nemzeti Audiovizuális Archívum (NAVA) (Hungarian National Broadcasting Archive)
Blinken Open Society Archives

India
National Film Archive of India
Film Heritage Foundation
Films Division of India

Iran
Islamic Republic of Iran Broadcasting Archive

Ireland
Irish Film Archive
Radharc Archive

Israel
 Israel Film Archive Jerusalem Cinematheque 
 Steven Spielberg Jewish Film Archive
 Yad Vashem Archives

Italy
 Cineteca di Bologna
 Archivio Audiovisivo del Movimento Operaio e Democratico
 ASCinema - Archivio Siciliano del Cinema
Film archive in Torino Museo Nazionale Del Cinema
Centro Sperimentale Di Cinematografia (National Film Archive)

Japan
 National Film Archive of Japan

Laos
 National Library of Laos

Lebanon
 Cinematheque du Liban

Malawi
 National Archives of Malawi

Mexico
Centro de Capacitación Cinematográfica
Cineteca Nacional de México
Filmoteca UNAM
Agrasánchez Film Archive
Agrasánchez Film Library

Mongolia
 National Archives of Mongolia

North Macedonia 

 Cinematheque of Macedonia

Netherlands
EYE Film Institute Netherlands

New Zealand
Ngā Taonga Sound & Vision

Nigeria
 University of Nigeria, Nsukka

Philippines
ABS-CBN Film Archives
CCP Library and Archives
Philippine Film Archive

Portugal
 Cinemateca Portuguesa

Romania
Arhiva Națională de Filme

Russia
Russian State Film and Photo Archive 
Gosfilmofond of Russia
 State Television and Radio Fund

Serbia
Yugoslav Film Archive

Singapore
Asian Film Archive
National Archives of Singapore

Slovenia
Archives of the Republic of Slovenia

South Africa
 National Archives of South Africa
 University of Cape Town: Centre for Popular Memory 
 University of the Witwatersrand Archive

South Korea
Korean Film Archive

Spain
Filmoteca Española

Sweden
Swedish Film Institute Archive

Taiwan
Taiwan Film and Audiovisual Institute

Ukraine
Oleksandr Dovzhenko National Centre

United Kingdom
BBC Archives
Beaulieu National Motor Museum
British Library
Imperial War Museum
Huntley Film Archives
East Anglian Film Archive
Cinenova Feminist Film Archive 
June Givanni Pan African Cinema Archive 
BFI National Archive
ITV Archive
Lincolnshire Film Archive
London's Screen Archive
London Television Archive
Media Archive for Central England
National Screen and Sound Archive of Wales
National Video Archive of Performance
Northern Ireland Screen
North West Film Archive
Northern Region Film and Television Archive
Screen Archive South East
South West Film and Television Archive
Scottish Screen
The National Archives
Stanley Kubrick Archive
Wessex Film and Sound Archive
Yorkshire Film Archive

United States
Academy Film Archive
Alaska Film Archives
Anthology Film Archives
Berkeley Art Museum and Pacific Film Archive
Black Film Center/Archive, Indiana University Bloomington
BYU Motion Picture Archive, L. Tom Perry Special Collections Library
Chicago Film Archives
CineFiles
DEFA Film Library
Fortunoff Video Archive for Holocaust Testimonies
Gene Siskel Film Center
George Eastman Museum
Harvard Film Archive
Historic Films Archive
Human Studies Film Archives
Indiana University Libraries Moving Image Archive
Japanese American National Museum
Motion Picture, Broadcasting and Sound Division, Library of Congress
National Film Registry
Museum of Modern Art Department of Film
National Air and Space Museum Film Archive
National Center for Jewish Film
New York University Libraries, Barbara Goldsmith Preservation & Conservation Department
Northeast Historic Film
Northwest Film Center
Prelinger Archives
Research Video (Warner-Pathe, Paramount Newsreels)
San Francisco Bay Area Television Archive
Texas Archive of the Moving Image
UCLA Film and Television Archive
Vanderbilt Television News Archive
Wisconsin Center for Film and Theater Research
WWE Video Library
Yale Film Archive

See also
 Archive
 List of archives
 International Federation of Film Archives
 List of sound archives

References

Bibliography 
 Le Roy, Éric. Cinémathèques et archives du film.
 Morgan, Jenny. The Film Researcher's Handbook: A Guide to Sources in North America, Asia, Australasia and Africa.

External links
 FIAF - International Federation of Film Archives
 FIAF Associates
 ACE - Association des Cinémathèques Européennes
National Film Preservation Board - List of archives by country
 FILM HERITAGE INSTITUTIONS IN THE EUROPEAN UNION - List of archives in the European Union
 Film archives

Film-related lists
 
Film